qconnect was a network of integrated public passenger transport services that cover subsidised and/or regulated bus, coach and aviation networks in Regional Queensland, Australia. It was introduced by the Queensland Government in December 2007, and is an agency operated by the Department of Transport and Main Roads (TMR). qconnect provides public transport services and greater connectivity and accessibility of services throughout regional, rural and remote Queensland by working with contracted transport operators.

qconnect was the regional counterpart for the Translink network operating across South East Queensland and some parts of Regional Queensland.

Throughout 2022 and 2023, regional bus operations were being transferred from qconnect and joined the wider Translink network. This occurred to create a more consistent and simplified public transport network in Queensland. On 16 January 2023, all regional networks will have been transferred to Translink, with the qconnect brand becoming defunct.

Bus Stops

 

qconnect has different types of bus stop designs, depending on the projected patronage and usage of the bus stop.

Hail'n'Ride Bus Stops

Hail'n'Ride bus stops are usually located in areas with low population or low projected passenger patronage. These stops generally feature no bus stop signage or infrastructure, and generally aren't wheelchair accessible. As with most qconnect routes, it is possible to hail a bus to stop anywhere along the bus route where it is safe to do so, so these stops are used as timing points for timetables.

Minimum Boarding Point Bus Stops

Minimum boarding point bus stops are usually located in low population suburban areas, along outbound routes, or in space constrained locations. These stops generally feature bus stop signage, along with tactile ground surface indicators, and are wheelchair accessible. They do not feature bus shelters, seating or any other infrastructure.

Regular and Intermediate Bus Stops

Regular and intermediate bus stops are usually located in suburban or city areas with low-moderate passenger demand and moderate service frequency. These stops generally feature bus stop signage, tactile ground surface indicators, wheelchair accessibility and bus shelters and seating.

Premium Bus Stops

Premium bus stops are usually located near major attractions, such as public services, shopping centres and bus interchanges. These stops generally feature improved bus stop signage, tactile ground surface indicators, wheelchair accessibility and multiple seated shelters. They can also feature infrastructure such as rubbish bins, vending machines and CCTV.

Zones, Fares and Ticketing
qconnect fares are calculated depending on how many zones are travelled. Zone boundaries can be found on route and network maps along with a fare zone calculator. Fare zones and fare costs differ between regions.

The following ticket types were available for bus patrons to purchase:

Single Ticket
Provides one way travel between the purchased zones - In some areas, to transfer buses, you will need to purchase a transfer single ticket

Daily Ticket
Provides unlimited return travel between the purchased zones until the last service of the day - In some areas, to transfer buses, you will need to purchase a transfer daily ticket
Daily tickets are priced at the cost of two single tickets

Weekly Ticket
Provides unlimited travel between the purchased zones until the last service after a period of seven consecutive days from the date of purchase - In some areas, to transfer buses, you will need to purchase a transfer weekly ticket

Weekly tickets are priced at the cost of eight single tickets and rounded up to the nearest ten cents

Concession fares
qconnect provides standard concession fares for the following:
Children 5–14 years of age inclusive - Children four and under travel for free
full-time students from approved Queensland schools, TAFEs, and universities undertaking Austudy, Abstudy or Youth Allowance approved courses - Approved Students are required to produce a Tertiary or Secondary Identification Card
Queensland Pensioners holding an approved Queensland Pensioner Concession Card issued by Centrelink or Department of Veterans' Affairs
Seniors holding a Queensland Seniors Card (not a Seniors Discount Card)

Ticketing

All qconnect services were cash only and did not accept go card payments. Queensland Department of Transport and Main Roads is currently in the testing phase of its Smart Ticketing Project. Once smart ticketing is rolled out, which is scheduled for 2023, all current Translink services (qconnect services before 16 January 2023) will be able to accept go card and credit cards, as well as being able to provide real-time bus tracking on the MyTranslink App and on third-party partners like Google Maps.

Smart Ticketing, has been trialed in Bowen, Hervey Bay, Innisfail, Maryborough and North Stradbroke Island. However, cashless payment were not being accepted during the trial in these areas.

See also

Translink
Department of Transport and Main Roads

References

Government agencies established in 2007
Government agencies of Queensland
Intermodal transport authorities in Australia
Public transport in Queensland
2007 establishments in Australia